U. Vimal Kumar is an Indian badminton player . He won the Indian National title consecutively for two years, 1988 and 1989. He also served as Chief National Coach of India. He is the Co Founder, Director and Chief Coach in Prakash Padukone Badminton Academy. He was awarded the Dronacharya Award in 2019. He was the bronze medalist in badminton at the 1986 Asian Games in the Men's team event.

Career
During his career he won French Open in 1983 & 1984 and Welsh International Open in 1988 & 1991. Vimal also represented India at the Barcelona Olympics in 1992, and was ranked within the top 20 in the world. He was the National chief coach of the Indian badminton squad for several years. He quit the post in 2006 to concentrate on coaching youngsters at the Prakash Padukone Badminton Academy. Now, he is currently coaching star player Saina Nehwal in Bangalore.He also coaches Parupalli Kashyap. Malayalam film actor Kalidas Jayaram is his nephew.

Achievements

IBF International

References

External links
 

Indian male badminton players
Indian national badminton champions
Badminton players at the 1992 Summer Olympics
Olympic badminton players of India
Malayali people
Racket sportspeople from Kerala
Living people
Asian Games medalists in badminton
Badminton players at the 1986 Asian Games
Badminton players at the 1990 Commonwealth Games
Asian Games bronze medalists for India
Medalists at the 1986 Asian Games
Recipients of the Dronacharya Award
Commonwealth Games competitors for India
1962 births